The East Journal on Approximations is a journal about approximation theory published in Sofia, Bulgaria.

External links
 East Journal on Approximations web site

References 

Mathematics journals
Publications established in 1995